Shengavit Football Club, is a defunct Armenian football club from the Shengavit District of the capital Yerevan. The clubs existed between 1990 and 1993.

In 2008, the name of Shengavit was taken by Ulisses FC to become their reserve team at the Armenian First League. Shengavit as reserves of Ulisses FC, became champions of the 2008 and 2011 seasons of the Armenian First League.

League record

References

Defunct football clubs in Armenia
Ulisses FC